Proteodes smithi is a species of moth in the family Depressariidae.It is endemic to New Zealand and is known from Homer in Fiordland, as well as other localities in the south western parts of the South Island. It has been observed tussock and mixed shrub habitat above the tree line at approximately 1000 m altitude. Adults are on the wing from December until April and are attracted to light.

Taxonomy 
This species was described by George Howes in 1946 using a specimen collected in early January at Homer, Fiordland by T. R. Smith, in whose honour this species is named.  The male holotype specimen is held at Te Papa.

Description 

Howes described the species as follows:
This species is similar in appearance to Proteodes clarkei but differs in that the wings are broader, the colouration is brighter and in the male the antennal pectinations are significantly shorter than those of P. clarkei.

Distribution 
This species is endemic to New Zealand and known from its type locality of Homer. It has also been observed in the south west of the South Island near Milford Sound and north of Lake Astelia in Southland.

Habitat 
The adults of this species have been observed in terrain that contained tussock, mixed scrub and rocks, above the tree line at about 1000 m.

Behaviour 
Adults have been observed as being on the wing from December until April. This species is attracted to light.

References

Moths described in 1946
Moths of New Zealand
Depressariidae
Endemic fauna of New Zealand
Taxa named by George Howes (entomologist)
Endemic moths of New Zealand